Lauren Spalding (born March 17, 1980) represented the United States as a kayaker in the 2004 Summer Olympics.  She is also a world champion outrigger canoe paddler and surfski racer.

Paddling career

Flat-Water Kayaking 
Spalding represented the United States as a sprint canoer in the early- to mid-2000s.  She paddled in the USA National Team Trials in New York in 2003 and qualified for the team, going on compete in the K-2 (Women's Kayak Doubles) 500m and K-4 (Women's Kayak Fours) 500m events at  the 2004 Pan American Games and the 2004 Olympics.

2004 Pan American Games 

 K-2 (Women's Kayak Doubles) 500m - 2nd place
 K-4 (Women's Kayak Fours) 500m - 1st place

2004 Olympic Games 

 K-2 (Women's Kayak Doubles) 500m - semi-finalist (with Kathy Colin)
 K-4 (Women's Kayak Fours) 500m - semi-finalist (with Carrie Johnson, Kathy Colin, and Marie Mijalis)

Outrigger Canoe Paddling

OC-1 Canoe Paddling 
Spalding is a 12-time winner of the Molokai OC-1 World Championships, a 32-mile race across the Kaiwi Channel separating the Hawaiian islands of Molokai and Oahu, and holds the seven fastest times ever achieved by a female in the race.

OC-6 Canoe Paddling 
Spalding competes in long distance OC-6 ("six-man" outrigger canoe) races with Team Bradley.  As a crew member, she has notched ten victories in the Na Wahine O Ke Kai, a 41-mile race across the Kaiwi Channel that is considered to be the world championship of long-distance outrigger canoe paddling.

Surfski Racing 
Spalding is a 3-time winner of the Molokai World Surfski Championships.

References

1980 births
American female canoeists
Canoeists at the 2004 Summer Olympics
Living people
Olympic canoeists of the United States
21st-century American women